The 2012 Ster ZLM Toer cycling race  was the 17th running of the Ster ZLM Toer. It was part of the 2012 UCI Europe Tour and classed as a 2.1 event.

Schedule

Teams

Stages
Key: 
: Leader and eventual winner of General Classification.
: Leader and eventual winner of points classification.
: Leader and eventual winner of intermediate sprints classification.
: Leader and eventual winner of mountains' classification.

Stage 1
14 June 2012 – Eindhoven to Sittard-Geleen,

Stage 2
15 June 2012 – Nuth(Schimmert) to Nuth(Schimmert),

Stage 3
16 June 2012 – Hotel Verviers to Lake Gileppe,

Stage 4
17 June 2012 – Schijndel to Boxtel,

Classification leadership

Final standings

References

Ster ZLM Tour
Cycle races in the Netherlands